Yahazu Dam is a gravity dam located in Saga Prefecture in Japan. The dam is used for irrigation and water supply. The catchment area of the dam is 2.1 km2. The dam impounds about 13  ha of land when full and can store 1390 thousand cubic meters of water. The construction of the dam was started on 1981 and completed in 1993.

References

Dams in Saga Prefecture
1993 establishments in Japan